The following is a list of international trips made by Kim Jong-un during his tenure as General Secretary of the Workers' Party of Korea, Chairman of the State Affairs Commission and Chairman of the Central Military Commission. He has made nine foreign trips to five countries since he took office as Commander-in-Chief and Supreme Leader of North Korea in 2011. His first international state visit was to China in March 2018.

The number of visits per country where he traveled are:
 Four visits to China
 Two visits to South Korea
 One visit to Russia, Singapore, and Vietnam

Summary of official trips

2018

2019

Gallery

Potential future trips

See also

 List of international presidential trips made by Moon Jae-in
 List of international trips made by Kim Jong-il
 List of international trips made by Kim Il-sung
 2017–18 North Korea crisis
 Kim–Xi meetings
 Kim–Putin meetings
 April 2018 inter-Korean summit
 2018 North Korea–United States Singapore Summit
 2019 North Korea–United States Hanoi Summit
 2019 Koreas–United States DMZ Summit
 North Korean leaders' trains
 Ilyushin Il-62 (Russian long-range narrow-body jet airliner)

References

External links
 Official website  of the Ministry of Foreign Affairs of North Korea

State visits by North Korean leaders
Kim Jong-un
2018 in international relations
Diplomacy-related lists